Intuition is the fourth studio album by the Norwegian glam metal band TNT. The sound of the album was more commercial than on their previous albums. It is one of their most successful albums so far. Swedish metal band Dragonland covered the album's title track on their album Astronomy.
The CD was reissued by Rock Candy Records in February 2022

Track listing

Personnel

Band 
Tony Harnell – vocals
Ronni Le Tekrø – guitars, 1/4 stepper guitar, lead vocals on "Ordinary Lover"
Morty Black – bass guitar, pedal synthesizer, fretless bass with reverb and chorus effect on "Forever Shine On"
Kenneth Odiin – drums, percussion

Additional personnel
Kjetil Bjerkestrand – keyboards
Joe Lynn Turner – background vocals

Chart

Album

Singles

Album credits 
Bjørn Nessjø – Producer
Rune Nordahl – Engineer

Sources

http://www.ronniletekro.com/discography-album-11.html

1989 albums
TNT (Norwegian band) albums